In the history of the periodic table, Döbereiner's triads were an early attempt to sort the elements into some logical order and sets based on their physical properties. They are analogous to the groups (columns) on the modern periodic table. 53 elements were known at his time.

In 1817, a letter by  reported Johann Wolfgang Döbereiner's observations of the alkaline earths; namely, that strontium had properties that were intermediate to those of calcium and barium.  

By 1829, Döbereiner had found other groups of three elements (hence "triads") whose physical properties were similarly related.  He also noted that some quantifiable properties of elements (e.g. atomic weight and density) in a triad followed a trend whereby the value of the middle element in the triad would be exactly or nearly predicted by taking the arithmetic mean of values for that property of the other two elements. These are as follows:

Limitations:

All the known elements could not be arranged in the form of triads. For very low-mass or very high mass elements, the Döbereiner’s triads are not applicable. Take the example of F (Fluorine), Cl (Chlorine), and Br (Bromine). The atomic mass of Cl is not an arithmetic mean of the atomic masses of F and Br.As the techniques for accurately measuring atomic masses improved, the Döbereiner’s triad was found to fail to remain strictly valid.

References 

 

History of chemistry
Chemical classification